Kossi Casimir Akoto (born 3 March 1969) is a Togolese former sprinter. He competed in the 400 metres at the 1992 Summer Olympics and the 1996 Summer Olympics.

References

External links
 

1969 births
Living people
Athletes (track and field) at the 1992 Summer Olympics
Athletes (track and field) at the 1996 Summer Olympics
Togolese male sprinters
Olympic athletes of Togo
Place of birth missing (living people)
21st-century Togolese people